Omar is an unincorporated community and census-designated place (CDP) in Logan County, West Virginia, United States. Omar has a post office with ZIP code 25638. As of the 2010 census, its population was 552.

The community was named after James Omar Cole, one of the original lessors.

References

Census-designated places in Logan County, West Virginia
Census-designated places in West Virginia
Coal towns in West Virginia